George Newell Bowers (1849 – 1909, active 1872–1906) was an American painter in Springfield, Massachusetts.

Few details are known of Bowers' life. He worked as a druggist's clerk in Springfield, Massachusetts before leaving to study art at the Art Students League of New York in New York City, and then from 1874 to 1879 in the studio of Léon Bonnat in Paris. He then returned as a painter to Springfield. After further study with the Art Student League, circa 1892 he became an impressionist landscape painter.

References 
 Lee M. Edwards, Timothy Anglin Burgard, Domestic bliss: family life in American painting, 1840-1910, page 132, Hudson River Museum, 1986.
 Mutual Art entry

1849 births
1909 deaths
19th-century American painters
American male painters
20th-century American painters
American Impressionist painters
Art Students League of New York alumni
19th-century American male artists
20th-century American male artists